The Turkish diaspora ( or Türk gurbetçiler) refers to ethnic Turkish people who have migrated from, or are the descendants of migrants from, the Republic of Turkey, Northern Cyprus or other modern nation-states that were once part of the former Ottoman Empire. Therefore, the Turkish diaspora is not only formed by people with roots from mainland Anatolia and Eastern Thrace (i.e. the modern Turkish borders); rather, it is also formed of Turkish communities which have also left traditional areas of Turkish settlements in the Balkans (such as Bulgaria, Greece, North Macedonia, Romania etc.), the island of Cyprus, the region of Meskhetia in Georgia, and the Arab world (such as Algeria, Iraq, Lebanon, and Syria).

In particular, most mainland Turkish migration has been to Western and Northern Europe. Meanwhile, almost all the Turkish minorities in former Ottoman lands have a large diaspora in Turkey, many having migrated as muhacirs (refugees); furthermore, the Cretan Turks have migrated throughout the Levant; Cypriot Turks have a significant diaspora in the English-speaking countries (especially the UK and Australia); the Meskhetian Turks have a large diaspora in Central Asia; and Algerian Turks and Tunisian Turks have mostly settled in France. Since Bulgarian Turks and Romanian Turks gained EU citizenship in 2007, their diasporas in Western Europe significantly increased once restrictions on movement came to a halt in 2012.

Diasporas

Europe

As early as 1997 Professor Servet Bayram and Professor Barbara Seels said that there was 10 million Turks living in Western Europe and the Balkans (i.e. excluding Cyprus and Turkey). By 2010, Boris Kharkovsky from the Center for Ethnic and Political Science Studies said that there was up to 15 million Turks living in the European Union. According to Dr Araks Pashayan 10 million "Euro-Turks" alone were living in Germany, France, the Netherlands and Belgium in 2012. Furthermore, there are significant Turkish communities living in Austria, the UK, Switzerland, Italy, Liechtenstein and the Scandinavian countries. Meanwhile, approximately 400,000 Meskhetian Turks live in the European regions of the Post-Soviet states (i.e. Azerbaijan, Georgia, Kazakhstan, Russia and Ukraine).

In addition to the modern Turkish diaspora in Europe, there are also traditional Turkish communities in post-Ottoman nation-states. For example, Turkish Cypriots and Turkish settlers living in North Cyprus number around 300,000 to 500,000. In addition, in Southeastern Europe there is over 1 million Turks living in the Balkan countries (i.e. Bosnia and Herzegovina, Bulgaria, Croatia, Greece, Kosovo, Montenegro, North Macedonia, Romania and Serbia). Since the 20th century, these ethnic Turkish communities have also migrated to Western Europe and have enlarged the Turkish diaspora significantly (e.g. Algerian Turks have mostly settled in France; Bulgarian Turks have migrated mostly to Germany, the Netherlands, and Sweden; Turkish Cypriots have a large population in the UK; Macedonian Turks have migrated mostly to Sweden; Tunisian Turks have migrated mostly to France and Italy; and Western Thrace Turks have mostly migrated to Germany and the Netherlands). More recently, since the "European migrant crisis" (2014–20), Iraqi Turks, Kosovo Turks and Syrian Turks have also settled in areas where there are large Turkish diasporas.

Consequently, within the diaspora, ethnic Turkish people now form the largest minority group in Austria, Denmark, Germany and the Netherlands.

Germany

The Turkish-Germans are the largest ethnic minority group in Germany and also the largest Turkish community in the Turkish diaspora.

The German census counts around three million Turks living in Germany. This does not only count those born in Turkey, but also descendants. The majority of ethnic Turks living in Germany have either arrived from or originate from Turkey; however, there are also significant ethnic Turkish communities which have come from (or descend from) other post-Ottoman nation-states in the Balkans (especially from Bulgaria and Greece), as well as from the island of Cyprus, and Lebanon. More recently, since the European migrant crisis (2014–19), there has also been a significant increase in the number of ethnic Turks from Syria, Iraq and Kosovo who have come to Germany.

France

The Turks living in France form one of the largest Turkish communities in Western Europe. Official data on the total number of French Turks is not available because the French census only records statistics on the country of birth rather than one's ethnic affiliation.

Although the majority of French Turks descend from the Republic of Turkey, there has also been significant Turkish migration from other post-Ottoman countries including ethnic Turkish communities which have come to France from North Africa (especially Algeria and Tunisia), the Balkans (e.g. from Bulgaria, Greece, Kosovo, North Macedonia and Romania), the island of Cyprus, and more recently from Iraq, Lebanon, and Syria.

In 2014 Professor Pierre Vermeren reported in L'Express that the Turkish population was around 800,000. However, an earlier academic publication in 2010 by Dr Jean-Gustave Hentz and Dr Michel Hasselmann said that there was already 1 million Turks living in France. Professor İzzet Er, as well as the French-Armenian politician Garo Yalic (who is an advisor to Valerie Boyer), also said that there was 1,000,000 Turks in France in 2011 and 2012 respectively. More recently, the Turkish-French population has been estimated to be more than one million according to French-published articles in Le Petit Journal (2019) and Marianne (2020).

The Netherlands

The Turkish-Dutch community form the largest ethnic minority group in the Netherlands. The majority of Dutch Turks descend from the Republic of Turkey; however there has also been significant Turkish migration waves from other post-Ottoman countries including ethnic Turkish communities which have come to the Netherlands from the Balkans (e.g. especially from Bulgaria, Greece, and North Macedonia), the island of Cyprus, and more recently during the European migrant crisis from Syria, Iraq and Kosovo. In addition, there has been migration to the Netherlands from the Turkish diaspora; many Turkish-Belgians and Turkish-Germans have arrived in the country as Belgian and German citizens.

The Dutch official census only collects data on country of birth, rather than ethnically; consequently, the total number of ethnic Turkish migrants (regardless of country of birth) nor the third, fourth or fifth generation of the Turkish-Dutch community have been collectively counted. Assistant Professor Suzanne Aalberse, Professor Ad Backus and Professor Pieter Muysken have said that "over the years" the Dutch-Turkish community "must have numbered half a million". However, there are significantly higher estimates. As early as 2003, the political scientist and international relations expert Dr Nathalie Tocci said that there was already "two million Turks in Holland". Rita van Veen also reported in Trouw that there was 2 million Turks in the Netherlands in 2007. More recently, in 2020, a report published in L1mburg Centraal estimated that there are more than 2 million Dutch-Turks. Voetbal International also reported in 2020 that the Dutch football club Fortuna Sittard will be carrying out annual scouting activities to find "Turkish talent"  among the approximately 2 million Turkish-Dutch community.

In 2009 The Sophia Echo reported that Bulgarian Turks were now the fastest-growing group of immigrants in the Netherlands.

Austria

The Turkish community, including descendants, form the largest ethnic minority in Austria. In 2011 a report by the Initiative Minderheiten said that there was 360,000 people of Turkish origin living in Austria. This figure has also been echoed by the former Austrian Foreign Minister and Chancellor of Austria Sebastian Kurz. However, the former Austrian MEP, Andreas Mölzer, has claimed that there are 500,000 Turks in the country.

Belgium

In 2012 Professor Raymond Taras said that the Belgian-Turkish community was over 200,000. More recently, in 2019 Dr Altay Manço and Dr Ertugrul Taş said that there was 250,000 Belgian residents of Turkish origin.

The United Kingdom

In 2011 the Home Affairs Committee stated here was 500,000 British Turks made up of 300,000 Turkish Cypriots, 150,000 Turkish nationals (i.e. people from Turkey), and smaller groups of Bulgarian Turks and Romanian Turks. Despite a lack of statistics on the collective number of Turks who have immigrated from their traditional homelands, it is known that Germany, Austria, the Netherlands and France all have larger Turkish diaspora communities than the UK.

Sweden

In 2009 the Swedish Ministry for Foreign Affairs said that there was almost 100,000 people with a Turkish background living in Sweden. More recently, in 2018 the Swedish Consul General, Therese Hyden, said that the population was now around 150,000.

Switzerland

In 2017 there was over 120,000 Turks living in Switzerland. They mostly live in German-speaking regions, especially in the cantons of Zurich, Aargau and Basel. Figures on naturalization and migration from Turkey has been declining, however, the Swiss population with a Turkish migration background continues to grow.

Denmark

The Turkish community form the largest ethnic minority in Denmark. In 2008, it was estimated that Danes of Turkish origin numbered 70,000.

Italy

In 2020 there were 50,000 Turkish citizens living in Italy; however, this figure does not include naturalized Italian citizens of Turkish origin or their descendants. Between 2008 and 2020 some 5,295 Turkish citizens acquired Italian citizenship.

In addition to the diaspora, some of the population in Moena has identified as Turkish since the 17th century.

Norway

In 2013 there was roughly 16,500 Norwegians of Turkish descent living in Norway.

Finland

In 2010 Professor Zeki Kütük said that there was approximately 10,000 people of Turkish origin living in Finland.

Poland

In 2013 data from the Institute of Public Affairs showed that there was 5,000 Turks living in Poland.

Portugal
In 2021 data from the National Statistical Institute showed that there were 1,363 Turks legally living in Portugal. In addition, between 2002 and 2020, 270 Turks acquired Portuguese citizenship.

Liechtenstein

Liechtenstein does not record data on the ethnicity of its citizens; however, in 2009, the Turkish community was estimated to number approximately 1,000 out of a total population of 35,000. Hence, estimates suggest that the Turks form around 3% of Liechtenstein's total population and that they are the fifth largest ethnic group in the country.

North America

United States
  

In 1996 Professor John J. Grabowski estimated that there was 500,000 Turks living in the United States. By 2009, Erdal Şafak said that the Turkish American community was approximately 850,000 to 900,000. More recently, in 2012 the former United States Secretary of Commerce, John Bryson, confirmed at the Center for American Progress that the Turkish American community was now over 1,000,000:

There are, however, much higher estimates. Non-governmental Turkish organizations in the USA claim that there are at least 3,000,000 people of Turkish origin living in the United States, including Turkish Americans as well as new Turkish migrant workers, students and illegal migrants. Consequently, since the twenty-first century, the Turkish American population is fast approaching the significant number of Turks in Germany because most students, expats, etc. decide to live permanently in the United States.

Canada
 

According to the 2016 Canadian census, 63,955 people voluntarily declared their ethnicity as "Turkish". However, in 2018, the Canadian Ambassador Chris Cooter said that there was approximately 100,000 Turkish Canadians living in the country, as well as several thousand Turkish students:

The "Federation of Canadian Turkish Associations" and the "Federation of Chinese Canadians in Markham" have also reported that there was over 100,000 Turkish Canadians living in the country.

South America

Venezuela

According to statistics, there are likely around 27,000 people of Turkish ancestry in Venezuela. This refers to people who are either descendants of immigrants who came from the Ottoman Empire before 1923 or who came from the Republic of Turkey since then. Additionally, Turks who immigrated from countries neighboring Turkey are also counted in this figure. It's likely that most of the Turkish Venezuelans trace their ancestry to immigrants from the Ottoman Empire, who arrived to Venezuela at the same time most of the Arab diaspora in South America had emigrated as well.

Brazil
There are 6,300 people of Turkish ancestry currently living in Brazil. According to Brazilian statistics there are 2,347 Turkish-born people living in Brazil as of 2021.

Oceania

Australia
 
In 1994 a report by The Age estimated that the Turkish Australian community numbered 150,000. By 2013 Louise Asher, who was a member of the Victorian Legislative Assembly, said that the Turkish Australian community in Melbourne alone had numbered 300,000. More recently, the number of Turkish Australians who originate from Turkey reached 200,000 in 2017; in addition, the Turkish Cypriot-Australian community was estimated to number 120,000 in 2016.

New Zealand
 
In 2010 the Turkish-New Zealander population was estimated to number between 2,000 to 3,000; in addition, the Turkish Cypriot-New Zealander population was 1,600 in 2016.

Diaspora of Algerian Turks

Initially, the first wave of migration occurred in 1830 when many Turks were forced to leave the region once the French took control over Algeria; approximately 10,000 were shipped off to Turkey whilst many others migrated to other regions of the Ottoman Empire, including Palestine, Syria, Arabia, and Egypt. Furthermore, some Turkish/Kouloughli families also settled in Morocco (such as in Tangier and Tétouan).

In regards to modern migration, there are many Algerian Turks who have emigrated to Europe and, hence, make up part of Algeria's diaspora. For example, there is a noticeable Algerian community of Turkish descent living in England. Many Algerians attend the Suleymaniye Mosque which is owned by the British-Turkish community. There are also thousands of Algerian Turks living in France. Germany, Switzerland, the Netherlands, Belgium, Canada, and Spain are also top receiving countries of Algerian citizens.

Diaspora of Bulgarian Turks

Diaspora of Cretan Turks

Diaspora of Cypriot Turks

Diaspora of Iraqi Turks

Most Iraqi Turkmen migrate to Turkey followed by Germany, Denmark, and Sweden. There are also Iraqi Turkmen communities living in Canada, the United States, Australia, New Zealand, Greece, the Netherlands, and the United Kingdom.

There are many established Iraqi Turkmen diaspora communities, such as the Canadian Iraqi Turkmen Culture Association, based in Canada.

Diaspora of Lebanese Turks

Due to the numerous wars in Lebanon since the 1970s onwards, many Lebanese Turks have sought refuge in Turkey and Europe, particularly in Germany. Indeed, many Lebanese Turks were aware of the large German-Turkish population and saw this as an opportunity to find work once settling in Europe. In particular, the largest wave of Lebanese-Turkish migration occurred once the Israel-Lebanon war of 2006 began. During this period more than 20,000 Turks fled Lebanon, particularly from Beirut, and settled in Germany.

Diaspora of Macedonian Turks

Diaspora of Meskhetian Turks

Diaspora of Palestinian Turks

Both during and after the 1947–1949 Palestine war, some members of Palestine's Turkish minority fled the region (particularly the Jezreel Valley region and the Golan Heights) and settled in Lebanon, Syria, and Jordan.
 In Jordan, there is approximately 55,000  Palestinian-Turkish refugees in Irbid 5,000 near Amman 5,000 in El-Sahne 3,000 in El-Reyyan 2,500 in El-Bakaa 1,500 in El-Zerkaa and 1,500 in Sahab

Diaspora of Romanian Turks

Diaspora of Syrian Turks

Since the outbreak of the Syrian Civil War, hundreds of thousands of Syrian Turkmen have been internally displaced and/or forced to leave the country, and most of them have sought refuge in neighbouring states and Western Europe. In particular, approximately 300,000 to 500,000 Syrian Turkmen have taken refuge in the Republic of Turkey. Moreover, there are between 125,000 and 150,000 Syrian Turkmen refugees in Lebanon, which means they outnumber the long-established Turkish minority in Lebanon.

In 2020 it was reported that 1 million Syrian Turkmen were living in Turkey and demanding that the Turkish government grant them Turkish citizenship.

Diaspora of Turkish Jews 
In 2012, it was estimated that around 280,000 Jews living in Israel were from Turkey or of Turkish descent. In Israel, the Arkadaş Association was founded by Turkish Jews to maintain their relationship with Turkey.

Diaspora of Western Thrace Turks

In 1990, it was estimated that around 300,000 to 400,000 Western Thrace Turks had migrated to Turkey since 1923. Moreover, from the 1950s onwards,  Turks of Western Thrace began to immigrate to Western Europe alongside other Greek citizens. Whilst many Western Thrace Turks had intended to return to Greece after working for a number of years, a new Greek law was introduced which effectively forced the minority to remain in their host countries. Article 19 of the 1955 Greek Constitution essentially stripped the Western Thrace Turks living abroad (particularly those in Germany and Turkey) of their Greek citizenship. 
According to Article 19 of the Greek Constitution 

This law continued to effect Western Thrace Turks studying in Turkey and Germany in the late 1980s. A report published by the Human Rights Watch in 1990 confirmed that:

Despite many being stripped of their Greek citizenship since 1955, Western Thrace Turks continued to migrate to Western Europe the 1960s and 1970s because the Thracian tobacco industry was affected by a severe crisis and many tobacco growers lost their income. Between 1970 and 2010, approximately 40,000 Western Thrace Turks arrived in Western Europe, most of which settled in Germany. In addition, between 2010 and 2018, a further 30,000 Western Thrace Turks left for Western Europe due to the Greek government-debt crisis. Thus, in addition to the thousands who migrated in the 1950s and 1960s, 70,000 Western Thrace Turks have migrated to Western Europe between 1970 and 2018. Around 80% of the Western Thracian Turks in Western Europe are living in Germany. The remainder have emigrated to the Netherlands, the United Kingdom, Austria and Italy; furthermore, outside of Europe, they have built communities in Australia, Canada and the United States.

See also
Turkish population
Turks in Europe
Turkish communities and minorities in the former Ottoman Empire
Turks in the Arab world
Turks in Israel
Turks in the United States
Turks in Australia
Turks in Canada
Turks in Russia
Turks in Japan
Turks in New Zealand

References

Turkish communities outside Turkey